George Innes is an actor.

George Innes or Inness may also refer to:

George Innes (bishop) (1717–1781), Bishop of Brechin 1778–1781
Sir George Innes, 4th Baronet (died c. 1690), of the Innes baronets
Sir George Innes, 2nd Baronet (died c. 1715), of the Innes baronets
George Inness (1825–1894), American landscape painter
George Inness Jr. (1854–1926), American figure and landscape painter
George Innes-Ker, 9th Duke of Roxburghe (1913–1974)
George Innes (RAF officer) (1923–2015), Royal Air Force officer